John Owusu-Addo (born 1928) is a Ghanaian architect.

Personal life 
John Owusu Addo was born in Akwadum, Eastern region as the second child of his mother and a son of his late father on May 30, 1928. He is a seed of the royal Apempoa family. His family moved from the Ashanti Region following a disagreement with the Ashanti King in 1875. They later settled in a farming village in the Eastern region of Ghana, Akwadum.

Education 
Addo had his basic education at Akwadum Methodist School. He relocated to the capital of Eastern region after the death of his father to live with his sister and her husband. Following his completion of Standard 7 with distinction, he gained admission into Kumasi Wesley College Teacher Training College from 1944 to 1947.  He continued to study arts after his four-year education at the teacher training college. Having passed the entrance exams, he enrolled in Achimota Specialist Training College to study arts until 1950. His interest in Architecture grew while at the Achimota Specialist Training College.

Career 
Addo sat for the London Matriculation Exams in 1951 which he passed. He was posted as a teacher to his premier station at College of Education, Bechem, then St Joseph's Training College. He was moved to Kumasi College of Science and Technology (now Kwame Nkrumah University of Science and Technology) after a year in Bechem. There, his interest in architecture heightened after his encounter with some construction projects.

References 

Living people
1928 births
Ghanaian architects
20th-century architects
People from Eastern Region (Ghana)
Academic staff of Kwame Nkrumah University of Science and Technology